"Written Songs" is the third single from Irish trio The Original Rudeboys. It was produced by Jake Gosling and reworked from the album This Life by Ash Howes. The song was released as a single on 20 July 2012 on an EP entitled Written Songs (Feeling Good), through Gotta Run Records.

Track listing
Written Songs (Feeling Good) EP
 "Written Songs (Feeling Good)" - 3:36
 "Dublin Days" - 4:11
 "Sunny Days" (Feat. FemFel)- 3:29
 "Crazy" - 3:49

Charts

Critical reception
The song was generally well received. Hot Press called it "a feel-good, catchy summer tune". Vicky Gottschalk of popular Irish music website iammusic stated "The Original Rudeboys are onto a winner with their fresh sound and unique take on the music industry."

References

2012 songs
2012 singles
Irish songs
Song recordings produced by Jake Gosling